On May 24–25, 1957, a tornado outbreak primarily affected the Western High Plains, Central Great Plains, and Central Oklahoma/Texas Plains of the United States. 45 tornadoes touched down over the area, most of which took place across northern and western Texas, in addition to southern Oklahoma. Overall activity initiated over eastern New Mexico and spread northeastward as far as southwestern Wisconsin. The strongest tornado, which occurred in southern Oklahoma on May 24, was assigned a rating of F4 near Lawton. Anomalously, some tornadoes touched down during the early morning hours, rather than late afternoon or early evening, when daytime heating typically peaks.

Background

The week of May 20–26, 1957, was the most prolific in terms of tornado activity recorded to date. On May 20–21, an upper-level trough traversed the Central United States. As it did so, a significant tornado outbreak took place over portions of Kansas, Nebraska, Missouri, and Oklahoma. Cold upper air temperatures and marginal surface dew points produced severe weather across the southern and central Great Plains. On May 21, the vigorous shortwave trough, co-located with a deep surface low, produced a violent tornado in Minnesota, while additional tornadoes killed fifteen people in Missouri.

On May 22, surface weather analysis indicated another low-pressure area over southwestern Oklahoma. In attendance, a series of cold fronts affected western Texas and eastern New Mexico. During their passage, outflow from thunderstorms affected the warm sector, farther to the southeast. On May 23, dew points rose across western Texas, and temperatures reached  in the warm sector. By 06:00 UTC (1:00 a.m. CDT/midnight MDT) on May 24, dew points of  surged into southeastern New Mexico on both sides of a warm front. A new surface low-pressure area also developed over New Mexico. Nine hours later, lifted index values increased to -11, coincident with surface-based convective available potential energy (CAPE) values near 3,500 J/kg. Based on observations from weather stations, the first thunderstorms developed by 16:30 UTC (11:30 a.m. CDT/10:30 a.m. MDT).

Confirmed tornadoes

In addition to these tornadoes, there were at least three unconfirmed events. One tornado, sighted around 11:17 a.m. It remained over rural areas and inflicted no damage. Additionally, at least one undocumented tornado was reported southeast and east of Midland around 6:30–7:15 p.m. (00:30–01:15 UTC). A brief tornado also may have touched down near Moore in the Oklahoma City metropolitan area, breaking tree branches and windows. None of these tornadoes was officially recorded in the National Weather Service database.

May 24 event

May 25 event

See also
List of North American tornadoes and tornado outbreaks

Notes

References

F3 tornadoes by date
F4 tornadoes by date
 ,1957-05-24
 ,1957-05-24
Tornadoes of 1957
Tornadoes in Texas
Tornadoes in Oklahoma
1957 natural disasters in the United States
May 1957 events in the United States